The Grand Bahama Football League was the highest form of association football on the Bahamian island of Grand Bahama. Before 2008, the champion of the Grand Bahama Football League would compete with the champion of the New Providence Football League to determine the national title. In 2008, the two leagues merged to form the BFA Senior League.

Grand Bahama Football League Champions
1996 – Pub on the Mall Red Dogs
2000 – Abacom United FC
2001 – Abacom United FC
2002 – Abacom United FC
2003 – Abacom United FC
2004 – Quality Superstars
2005 – unknown
2006 – Brita Red Bulls
2007 – apparently not played
2008 – apparently not played
2017 – Dwayne Whylly FC

See also 
New Providence Football League
BFA Senior League

External links
 League standings
 RSSSF archives

2
Bah